Seton Healthcare Family, also known as Seton Family of Hospitals, is a Roman Catholic-affiliated hospital network in the Greater Austin area. It is a member of Ascension, a not-for-profit health organization located in St. Louis, Missouri.

History
A grassroots effort in the 1890s by citizens of Austin, Texas led to the opening of the Seton Infirmary on May 26, 1902. The citizenry asked the Daughters of Charity of St. Vincent de Paul to construct a Catholic hospital to take care of the sick and poor.

Over 100 years later the one 42-bed hospital, originally known as "Seton Infirmary" and located at 600 West 26th Street in Austin, Texas, has grown to serve a population of more than 1.8 million, with a special regard for the sick and poor. A Catholic health organization, Seton provides millions of dollars in charity care for the uninsured every year.

The healthcare network now includes five major medical centers, two of which are designated Level I Trauma Centers.  Dell Children's Medical Center of Central Texas is the only dedicated hospital for children in the region. Seton also operates two community hospitals, two rural hospitals and a mental health hospital along with multiple locations for outpatient medical services and three primary care clinics for the uninsured. Four facilities are designated Magnet hospitals by the American Nurses Credentialing Center. Seton has become the largest private employer in Central Texas, with approximately 11,000 associates.

In 2011, Seton partnered with the University of Texas System Board of Regents and the University of Texas Southwestern Medical Center in Dallas, one of the nation's leading academic medical centers, to increase the amount of medical education and medical research conducted in Central Texas.

Austin CyberKnife Center
Austin CyberKnife is based in the Clinical Education Center, on the campus of the former University Medical Center Brackenridge campus.

The Austin CyberKnife Center is a cancer treatment center using CyberKnife technology to treat malignant and benign tumors throughout the body. It has a Lung Optimization Treatment (LOT) System.

Facilities
  Ascension Seton Williamson
  Dell Seton Medical Center at The University of Texas
  Dell Children's Medical Center of Central Texas
  Seton Medical Center Austin
  Seton Edgar B. Davis Hospital
  Seton Highland Lakes Hospital
  Seton Northwest Hospital
  Seton Southwest Hospital
  Seton Shoal Creek Hospital
  Cedar Park Regional Medical Center
  Seton Medical Center Hays
  Central Texas Rehabilitation Hospital
  Seton Smithville Regional Hospital
  Seton Medical Center Harker Heights

 Former
 Brackenridge Hospital (owned by the City of Austin, contracted to Seton from 1995, until its closure in 2017)

Awards
Maternity Qualify Matters Award, Childbirth Connection
Dell Children’s LEED Platinum, US Green Building Council
Top 100 Integrated Health Systems, Verispan
Ernest A. Codman Award, Joint Commission

References

External links 
Seton Healthcare Family

Healthcare in Texas
Hospital networks in the United States
Cancer hospitals
Medical and health organizations based in Texas
Catholic hospital networks in the United States
Catholic health care